The J. William Fulbright College of Arts and Sciences is the liberal arts college at the University of Arkansas. It is named for former University President and United States Senator J. William Fulbright. The College has 19 different academic departments, and is the largest school or college at the University. Fulbright College's Creative Writing and Translation programs rank among the top in the nation.

Departments

 Department of Anthropology
 Department of Art and Sciences
 Department of Biological Sciences
 Department of Chemistry and Biochemistry
 Department of Communication
 Department of Computer Science and Computer Engineering
 Department of Drama
 Department of Economics
 Department of English
 Department of Geosciences
 Department of History
 The Ozark Historical Review
Published in the Spring semester
 Department of Journalism
 Department of Mathematical Sciences
 Department of Music
 Department of Philosophy
 Department of Physics
 Department of Political Science
 Department of Psychological Science
 Department of Sociology and Criminal Justice
 Department of World Languages, Literatures, and Cultures 
 School of Art
 School of Journalism and Strategic Media
 School of Social Work

School of Journalism and Strategic Media
The School of Journalism and Strategic Media at the University of Arkansas is a subdivision of the J. William Fulbright College of Arts and Sciences that teaches and researches news, broadcasting, advertising, public relations, and related media subjects. The school is located in Kimpel Hall just north of the Walton College of Business.

History
The school was founded for Walter John Lemke in 1928 and named in his honor posthumously in 1988.

Programs
The undergraduate program has three concentrations: Editorial/News Concentration, Broadcast Radio & TV Concentration, and Advertising & Public Relations.

The School also produces KUAF/National Public Radio, UATV, the university's student-run television network, "The Arkansas Traveler," the University's student newspaper, KXUA student radio, "The Razorback," the University's yearbook, and "The Hill Magazine," an annual in-depth publication.

School of Social Work
The baccalaureate Social Work (BSW) program has been offered since 1940, one of the oldest undergraduate social work programs in the United States. The Master Social Work program is also available for graduate Social Work students.

Social Work Research Center
The Social Work Research Center was established in 2001, and studies poverty in Arkansas. Results are published and brought to the attention of federal and state politicians.

Facilities

References

 "J. William Fulbright College of Arts and Sciences-Annual Report." University of Arkansas. 2007 Report. Retrieved on 6-8-2008.
 Shields Appointed Dean 
 Welcome to Fulbright College, 2015 

University of Arkansas
Liberal arts colleges at universities in the United States